Armadale Soccer Club is an Australian semi-professional soccer club based in Forrestdale, Western Australia. Armadale currently competes in the National Premier Leagues Western Australia, with matches played at Alfred Skeet Oval. The club provides grass roots to professional training, in a fun, social environment for males & females of all age groups. ASC prides itself on providing and enjoyable and supportive football environment for players of all ages and skill levels. Our club squads range from juniors (5–15 years old) all the way up to seniors including Social, Veterans, Ladies and NPL. Juniors are located at Morgan Park, Armadale and Seniors are located at Alfred Skeet Reserve, Forrestdale.

History
Armadale Soccer Club Inc. began in 1972, and was known at the time as "Westfield Park Sports and Progression Association", however just a year later the club changed to "Westfield Park Soccer Club". In 1974, the club had nine junior teams along with its senior teams, all playing on a Sunday at Gwyne Park Reserve in Armadale. That season was the first year the club joined the Amateur Soccer Association, and proved a great success, with the first team winning the Amateur Second Division (known at the time as ASA Division Three). More success was to follow, with the club winning the Amateur First Division the following season, and gaining promotion to the Amateur Premier Division for 1976. In 1980 the club changed its name to "Armadale Park Soccer Club" and also moved to Morgan Park. With the move the membership grew considerably and both juniors and seniors continued to be successful with Armadale to be the heavyweights of amateur football at the time. In 1985, the club joined the semi-professional competition and in its very first season playing Saturday football, Armadale won the Third Division (then known as Division Four) under coach Steve Nash.

This was also the year that Alfred Skeet Reserve in Forrestdale became the club's new home. From 1986 to 1991, Armadale Park played in what today would be known as the Second Division, with its best season being 1991 when they finished third. 1992 was the year of the great "soccer split", with two associations controlling Saturday football. Armadale elected to join the Professional Soccer League, and were placed into the higher league of the First Division. After finishing third, it was a struggle for the club, and were relegated back to the Second Division for the 1995 season. Two years later, the club were back in Division One due to Soccer West Coast restructuring the leagues to a two division competition. This was also the year that Armadale Park merged with Armadale City, the new name of the merged club would become "Armadale Soccer Club".

Armadale struggled in the higher league, finishing no higher than 10th for the first five seasons. This all changed in 2002 under the leadership of new coach Billy Russell, when Armadale finished second, and then third in 2003. 2004 would be one of the best seasons in Armadale's history, winning Division One and gaining promotion to the Premier League for the first time in their history. It's has been a credit to Armadale that they have remained there to this day, with the best season in the top flight being seventh place in 2010 under coach Brad Hassell. In 2018 Armadale lifted their first major trophy in their history under coach John O’Reilly, the State Cup, after beating Gwelup Croatia 2–0. It meant Armadale qualified to play in the national FFA Cup, where they lost 4–0 away to Carins FC.  

2022 they celebrate their 50th anniversary, and go into their 18th season in the top flight of WA football.
In this anniversary year, once again, Armadale SC progressed to the final of the WA State League cup, for the second time in their history.
But missed out on more silverware with a narrow 3-2 loss to local rivals Cockburn City.
Also advancing to the round of 32 in the FFA cup, Armadale lost 2-5 to Modbury Jets, from Adelaide. But the club achieved another first by hosting the Australia Cup game at the home ground, Alfred Skeet, in front of 700 strong crowd and also streaming Nationally on Channel 10.

The club have the most passionate supporters in the league, and the ‘Army’ are in full voice during home games, and on the road, Cheering on the REDS!!

Current squad

Current coaching staff
 John O'Reilly – Head Coach
 Salv tadora- Assistant Coach
 Sam Hutchings – GK Coach / Assistant Coach
 Mark Hofstein – Team Manager
 Mila Hofstein - Assistant Team Manager
 Chad Mclean – Head Physiotherapist

Seasons

Honors
 2022 WA State Cup Runners up
 2018 WA State Cup Winners
 2004 First Division Winners
 2002 First Division Runners up 
 1985 Third Division Winners

Notable past players

List includes players from Armadale youth or senior teams that have gone on to represent the Australian national team. 
  Trent Sainsbury (2006)

References

External links
 Armadale Soccer Club Official Website

National Premier Leagues clubs
Football West State League teams
Association football clubs established in 1972
1972 establishments in Australia